Ryan Caldwell (born June 15, 1981) is a Canadian former professional ice hockey. During the 2005–06 season he played two games for the New York Islanders and two more in the 2007–08 season for the Phoenix Coyotes.

Playing career
Prior to his professional career, Caldwell was an All-American defenceman and captained the University of Denver Pioneers to the 2004 NCAA Championship.

After two seasons in the SM-liiga with Ässät, Caldwell signed with fellow Finnish club, Lukko Rauma. During the 2012-13 season, he was mutually released from his contract and returned to the German DEL, with Eisbären Berlin.

On May 7, 2013, Caldwell was signed as a free agent to a two-year contract with the Thomas Sabo Ice Tigers.  In August 2014, Caldwell and the Ice Tigers mutually agreed to terminate his contract.

On August 26, 2014, the Schwenninger Wild Wings announced they had signed Caldwell. In the 2014–15 season, Caldwell contributed with 23 points in 52 games from the blueline, however was unable to lift the Wild Wings into the playoffs. On March 7, 2015, the Wild Wings opted not to offer Caldwell a new contract, rendering him a free agent.

After joining Norwegian club, Lørenskog IK midway through the 2015–16 season, Caldwell continued his journeyman career in the following summer by signing a one-year deal with Japanese club, Oji Eagles of the Asia League on July 22, 2016.

Career statistics

Awards and honours

References

External links

1981 births
Ässät players
Bridgeport Sound Tigers players
Canadian ice hockey defencemen
Daemyung Killer Whales players
DEG Metro Stars players
Denver Pioneers men's ice hockey players
Eisbären Berlin players
Ice hockey people from Manitoba
Living people
Lørenskog IK players
Lukko players
New York Islanders draft picks
New York Islanders players
NCAA men's ice hockey national champions
Oji Eagles players
Phoenix Coyotes players
San Antonio Rampage players
Schwenninger Wild Wings players
Sportspeople from Brandon, Manitoba
Syracuse Crunch players
Thomas Sabo Ice Tigers players
Thunder Bay Flyers players
Canadian expatriate ice hockey players in Norway
Canadian expatriate ice hockey players in Finland
Canadian expatriate ice hockey players in Germany
AHCA Division I men's ice hockey All-Americans